Godspower Umejuru Ake ,  (2 February 1940 – 8 August 2016) was a politician in Rivers State, Nigeria. He was a member of the Rivers State House of Assembly and a Deputy Speaker. from 1979 to 1983, representing the constituency of Ahoada I for the National Party of Nigeria. He was the Special Adviser on Lands and Housing to Governor Peter Odili, a position he held from 1999 until 2007, and even combined this role with the position of the National Vice Chairman of the People's Democratic Party from 2004 to 2007. He became the third Chairman of the Rivers State People's Democratic Party in 2008 and served until 2013 when the High Court ordered him removed from office.

Early life and education
Ake was born in Erema Town in Ogba–Egbema–Ndoni local government area of Rivers State. He was the first child of Robinson Ijeoma Ake and Margaret Nwanwinyioka Ake.

References

External links
GU Ake's biography

1940 births
2016 deaths
People from Ogba–Egbema–Ndoni
Members of the Rivers State House of Assembly
Advisers to the Governor of Rivers State
Rivers State Peoples Democratic Party chairs
National Party of Nigeria politicians
Members of the Order of the Federal Republic